We the Living is a two-part 1942 Italian romantic war drama film, based on Ayn Rand's 1936 novel of the same name. It was originally released as two films, Noi vivi (literally "We Live") and Addio Kira ("Goodbye Kira"). It was directed by Goffredo Alessandrini and produced by Scalera Film, and stars Alida Valli as Kira Argounova, Rossano Brazzi as Leo Kovalensky, and Fosco Giachetti as Andrei Taganov.

The nominally anti-communist, but de facto anti-authoritarian film was made and released in Italy during World War II, then subsequently banned by the Fascist government and pulled from theaters. The film was lost and forgotten for decades, then found and restored with Rand's involvement. It was released for the first time in the United States in 1986.

Cast

Production

Background

The film version of Ayn Rand's novel We the Living was made in Italy by Scalera Films in 1942. Rand's novel was considered a political hot potato by Fascist authorities in Rome, but was approved for filming due to the intervention of dictator Benito Mussolini's son. Goffredo Alessandrini, one of Italy's leading directors, and his young associate director, Anton Giulio Majano, knew that We the Living touched on volatile political issues, but they hoped they would be safe from repercussions because of the story's negative portrayal of the Soviet Union, Italy's wartime enemy. Alessandrini was a very successful director during Benito Mussolini's regime. His films are noted for their extreme realism, and have been lauded as anticipating the Neo-Realist movement that was to follow the end of the war. Although, initially, his films were influenced by his brief stay in Hollywood in the early 1930s for MGM Studios, he successfully made the transition from musical comedies to historical dramas and ideological propaganda films when the tide of war changed the focus of filmmaking.

Rights and writing
The studio never secured the movie rights from Ayn Rand, who at the time lived in the United States. Europe was at war, and the Fascist Ministry of Culture set up special laws with regards to negotiations for rights and copyrights with enemy countries, making it impossible to buy the rights. The film was made without the novelist's consent or knowledge, and no attempt was later made to compensate her.

The first script was adapted from the book by two Italian novelists, but director Alessandrini abandoned their script. He and his assistant decided to make the picture without a finished script. The script was often written the day before filming or pulled directly from the novel, resulting in an adaptation that was more faithful to the novel than is typical in film adaptations.

Working without a complete script, they were inadvertently shooting more material than could be edited down to one film, so it was decided that the film would be released as two separate movies entitled, Noi Vivi (We the Living) and Addio Kira (Goodbye Kira).

Casting and shooting

Cast in the leading roles were three of Italy's top box-offices attractions: 38-year-old Fosco Giachetti, a star of such magnitude that his casting was unquestioned, in the role of Andrei; Alida Valli, already a major star in Italy, played the role of Kira; and Rossano Brazzi played Leo. When We the Living was made in 1942, Brazzi was already among the highest paid Italian film stars, and at age 21, Alida Valli was also one of Italy's highest paid actresses. Many of the extras were White emigres from Russia living in Rome, and production designers were also born in Russia. Due to the difficulty in securing location permits during the war, the film was shot on Scalera sound stages.

Future leading man Raf Vallone appeared in the film as an extra. Ironically, in spite of the film's anti-Communist subject matter, Vallone was actually an ardent leftist and member of the banned Italian Communist Party. Prior to World War II, he worked as culture editor for the Party's official newspaper L'Unità. At the same time the film was being shot, Vallone was a secret agent for the anti-fascist Italian resistance, as a member of the Communist-affiliated 'Brigate Garibaldi' partisans.

Opening and reception

On September 14, 1942, the Italian film version of Ayn Rand's We the Living premiered at the Venice Film Festival. When the movie opened in Rome, it was a box-office success. The portrayal of an intelligent, sexually independent heroine was viewed as controversial. Shortly after its theatrical release, the Italian Government banned the film for reasons mentioned below.

Censorship

Prior to the films' release, they were nearly censored by Mussolini's government. Government officials demanded to see the film dailies, but the editors hid any sensitive material. The release of the films was permitted because the story itself was set in Soviet Russia and was directly critical of that regime. The films were "released in Italy, played for two months with great success - and then the Italian newspapers began objecting to it and saying that it was anti-Fascist, which it was, essentially." Though some pro-Fascist lines had been added to the film, the story is as much an indictment of Fascism as it is of Communism. Consequently, the Fascist government demanded the films be pulled from theaters and withdrawn from circulation.  Furthermore, the films were ordered to be destroyed. In an attempt to save the films, Massimo Ferrara, the studio chief for Scalera Films, hid the original negatives with a trusted friend, then sent the negatives of another Scalera production to authorities to be destroyed.

Disappearance and rediscovery
After the war, Ayn Rand learned of the "piracy" of her novel, and though Rand liked and was impressed by the film(s), she highly resented the distortion of her message with the addition of a few pro-Fascist additions to the film adaptation of her novel (mentioned in a letter to John C. Gall). Efforts to re-release the film were ended when Rand declined to grant the literary rights. Then, in the early 1950s, Scalera Films went out of business and the films dropped from sight completely.

The now missing films were rediscovered in the 1960s through the efforts of Rand's lawyers, Erika Holzer and Henry Mark Holzer, who went to Italy in search of the films. The search ended in the summer of 1968 when it was discovered that a business entity that owned dozens of vintage Italian films had obtained the original films. The Holzers brought a copy back to the United States.

Revision and re-release

Shortly thereafter, Duncan Scott began working with Ayn Rand on re-editing the films Noi Vivi and Addio Kira.  At this time, the two Italian films were combined into a single film with English subtitles. Certain subplots were cut to get the films down from four hours to a more manageable three-hour run-time.  The film was edited to be more faithful to Rand's original novel, and during this time, they also rid the films of Fascist propaganda, which was a distortion of Rand's message. This new version produced by the Holzers and Duncan Scott and was approved by Rand and her estate. It was re-released as We the Living in 1986.

The new version of We the Living premiered at the Telluride Film Festival in Colorado in 1986 — the first public showing of the film outside of Italy since World War II. Soon after, it was released in theaters throughout the US, Canada, and overseas. Today, a two-disc DVD of the film is sold by Duncan Scott Productions.

References

Works cited
  
 
 
  
 We the Living. Dir. Goffredo Alessandrini. Perf. Alida Valli, Rosanno Brassi, Fosco Giachetti. Scalera, 1942. Restoration producers Erika and Henry Holzer, Duncan Scott, 1986. Film.

External links

 IMDb page for We the Living (1986)
 Official Site for We the Living

1942 films
1942 romantic drama films
Italian black-and-white films
Films based on American novels
Films based on works by Ayn Rand
1940s Italian-language films
Italian romantic drama films
Films about Soviet repression
Films directed by Goffredo Alessandrini
Films scored by Renzo Rossellini
Censored films
Rediscovered Italian films
Films shot in Italy
Unofficial film adaptations
1940s Italian films